John June Nquku (born 1899, date of death unknown) was an early Swaziland nationalist and creator of Swaziland's first political party, the Swaziland Progressive Party.

Early life and education
Nquku was born in Pietermaritzburg, South Africa to a Zulu family. He went to Natal, South Africa and attended St. Chad's College before moving to Swaziland in 1930.

Career
Nquku began his career as a principal, later becoming an inspector of Swazi schools. He resigned from the position in 1940, joining the Swazi National Council. In 1944, Nquku became the secretary-general of the United Christian Church of Africa. In 1945, Nquku became President of the Swaziland Progressive Association, which then evolved into the Swaziland Progressive Party (SPP) in 1960.

Politics
On May 18, 1961, during a meeting to establish the constitution for Swaziland, Nquku was banished for having an unapproved and detrimental party. The following year, in February 1962, Nquku was deposed as party leader for allegedly corrupt and dictatorial practices. Ambrose Phesheya Zwane was elected to replace him. Later that year, in August 1962, Nquku was suspended from the SPP due to allegations of fraud, and was replaced by K.Y. Samketi.

In 1963, Nquku regained his position as party leader of the SPP after being appointed by the secretary of the government.

Literature
Outside of his political career, Nquku wrote multiple pamphlets which include a biography of the King of Swaziland Sobhuza II and a collection of folk tales in the Swazi language.

References

1899 births
Year of death missing
Swazi journalists
People from Pietermaritzburg
Zulu people
Swaziland Progressive Party politicians
South African emigrants to Eswatini